Nirmatrelvir is an antiviral medication developed by Pfizer which acts as an orally active 3C-like protease inhibitor. It is part of a nirmatrelvir/ritonavir combination used to treat COVID-19 and sold under the brand name Paxlovid.

Development

Pharmaceutical
Coronaviral proteases cleave multiple sites in the viral polyprotein, usually after there are glutamine residues. Early work on related human rhinoviruses showed that the flexible glutamine side chain in inhibitors could be replaced by a rigid pyrrolidone. These drugs had been further developed prior to the COVID-19 pandemic for other diseases including SARS. The utility of targeting the 3CL protease in a real world setting was first demonstrated in 2018 when GC376 (a prodrug of GC373) was used to treat the previously 100% lethal cat coronavirus disease, feline infectious peritonitis, caused by feline coronavirus. Nirmatrelvir and GC373 are both peptidomimetics, share the aforementioned pyrrolidone in P1 position and are competitive inhibitors. They use a nitrile and an aldehyde respectively to bind the catalytic cysteine. Pfizer investigated two series of compounds, with nitrile and benzothiazol-2-yl ketone as the reactive group, respectively, and in the end settled on using nitrile.

Nirmatrelvir was developed by modification of the earlier clinical candidate lufotrelvir, which is also a covalent protease inhibitor but its active element  is a phosphate prodrug of a hydroxyketone. Lufotrelvir needs to be administered intravenously limiting its use to a hospital setting. Stepwise modification of the tripeptide protein mimetic led to nirmatrelvir, which is suitable for oral administration. Key changes include a reduction in the number of hydrogen bond donors, and the number of rotatable bonds by introducing a rigid bicyclic non-canonical amino acid (specifically, a "fused cyclopropyl ring with two methyl groups"), which mimics the leucine residue found in earlier inhibitors. This residue had previously been used in the synthesis of boceprevir. Tert-leucine (abbreviation: Tle) used in the P3 position of nirmatrelvir was identified first as optimal non-canonical amino acid in potential drug targeting SARS-CoV-2 3C-like protease using combinatorial chemistry (hybrid combinatorial substrate library technology).

The leucine-like residue resulted in loss of a nearby contact with a glutamine on the 3C-like protease. To compensate Pfizer tried adding methane sulfonamide, acetamide, and trifluoroacetamide and discovered that of the three, trifluoroacetamide resulted in superior oral bioavailability.

Chemistry and pharmacology
Full details of the synthesis of nirmatrelvir were first published by scientists from Pfizer.

In the penultimate step a synthetic homochiral amino acid is coupled with a homochiral amino amide using the water-soluble carbodiimide EDCI as a coupling agent. The resulting intermediate is then treated with Burgess reagent, which dehydrates the amide group to the nitrile of the product.

Nirmatrelvir is a covalent inhibitor, binding directly to the catalytic cysteine (Cys145) residue of the cysteine protease enzyme.

In the co-packaged medication nirmatrelvir/ritonavir, ritonavir serves to slow the metabolism of nirmatrelvir via cytochrome enzyme inhibition, thereby increasing the circulating concentration of the main drug. This effect is also used in HIV therapy, where ritonavir is used in combination with another protease inhibitor to similarly enhance their pharmacokinetics.

Society and culture

Licensing 
In November 2021, Pfizer signed a license agreement with the United Nations–backed Medicines Patent Pool to allow nirmatrelvir to be manufactured and sold in 95 countries. Pfizer stated that the agreement will allow local medicine manufacturers to produce the pill "with the goal of facilitating greater access to the global population". The deal excludes several countries with major COVID-19 outbreaks including Brazil, China, Russia, Argentina, and Thailand.

Research 

The research that led to nirmatrelvir began on 16 March 2020, when Pfizer formally launched a project at its Cambridge, Massachusetts site to develop antiviral drugs for treating COVID-19. On 22 July 2020, Pfizer chemists were able to synthesize nirmatrelvir for the first time, although the importance of that moment was not clear then because it was just one of 20 candidates synthesized that week. On 1 September 2020, Pfizer completed a pharmacokinetic study in rats which suggested that nirmatrelvir could be administered orally. The actual synthesis of the drug for laboratory research and for clinical trials was carried out at Pfizer's Groton, Connecticut site.

In February 2021, Pfizer launched the company's first phase I trial of PF-07321332 (nirmatrelvir) at its clinical research unit in New Haven, Connecticut. According to Chemical & Engineering News, the drug went "from an idea to the first clinical test in a person in 12 months—a breathtaking pace at which to deliver a bespoke drug candidate."

References

External links 
 

Amides
COVID-19 drug development
Cyclopropanes
Nitriles
Pfizer brands
Pyrrolidones
SARS-CoV-2 main protease inhibitors
Trifluoromethyl compounds